The Polk County Courthouse is located in Balsam Lake, Wisconsin. It was added to the National Register of Historic Places in 1982.

Polk County Museum
The building served as a courthouse until 1975. It is now operated as the Polk County Museum by the Polk County Historical Society. The museum's exhibits include historic room displays, antique tools, farming equipment, toys and dolls, clothing, furniture, ceramic and glass ware items, household artifacts, and other exhibits about area history and culture.

References

External links

 Polk County Museum - official site

Buildings and structures in Polk County, Wisconsin
Museums in Polk County, Wisconsin
County courthouses in Wisconsin
Courthouses on the National Register of Historic Places in Wisconsin
History museums in Wisconsin
Richardsonian Romanesque architecture in Wisconsin
Government buildings completed in 1899
1899 establishments in Wisconsin
National Register of Historic Places in Polk County, Wisconsin